Laura Chiatti (born 15 July 1982, Castiglione del Lago, Italy) is an Italian actress and singer. She is the leading lady in two successful films: Ho voglia di te, alongside Riccardo Scamarcio, and Paolo Sorrentino's third film The Family Friend. The latter was entered into the 2006 Cannes Film Festival. In 2010 she voiced Princess Rapunzel in the Italian version of the Disney-animated feature film Tangled. 

She married fellow actor Marco Bocci in 2014. They have two sons: Enea (born 2015) and Pablo (born 2016).

Filmography

Films

Television

Advertising
Luigi Lavazza S.p.A. (2004-2005) testimonial
Vodafone (2006) testimonial
Breil (2012) testimonial with Nicolas Vaporidis

Prizes and awards

Prize Etruria Cinema as a revelation of the year (2005)
Prize Simpatia (2009) - withdrawn at Capitoline Hill

Gallery

References

External links 

 

1982 births
Living people
People from Castiglione del Lago
Italian film actresses
21st-century Italian singers
21st-century Italian women singers